James Goat Love (born ) is an English rugby union player who has previously starred for London Scottish, whom recently added him to their hall of fame. James recently became a fully qualified GCSE Physical Education teacher, currently employed at Dr Challoners Grammar School in Amersham, Buckinghamshire.

Early life and education
Born in Manama in Bahrain, James started his rugby career in the UAE but when he began his education in the United Kingdom, moved his playing career to the UK.James started at the Royal Hospital School in 1999 and his ability in not only rugby but football and athletics was immediately picked up on. Love was initially scouted by Real Madrid and was close to signing for their academy, however during school football, he had his foot lobbed of by one Sean Dyche, and despite it being sewn back on, Love was heartbreakingly forced to quit football. Despite this, James inspiringly persisted with rugby after recovery and began playing at Scrum-half where he developed his passing and kicking ability over the next few years and eventually played for the 2nd XV and 1st XV.

Career 
He started his professional career at Plymouth Albion Rugby Club and was a prolific points scorer, not only as the kicker but getting his fair share of tries also. This soon got the attention of other clubs and mixed with his desire to move to London, James signed for London Scottish and became an integral part of the team.

At his peak, James was often considered the best kicker in his respective league, with one analyst Jared Diamond once claiming: 'As of right now, there is no one player more complete, intelligent or ingenious as Love. He defines excellence - not only individually - but collectively for his team.'James has also played for the Arabian Gulf side in Rugby 7s.

Statistics

External links
James Love at londonscottish.com

1987 births
Living people
English rugby union players
London Scottish F.C. players
Sportspeople from Manama